Bagh Stallions is a Pakistani professional T20 franchise cricket team competes in the Kashmir Premier League. Umar Amin is the captain and Abdul Rehman is the coach of the team. The franchise represents Bagh which is the chief town and district headquarters of Bagh District.

History

2021 season

Bagh Stallions won 2 matches and lost 3 matches in the group stage. They missed out on the playoffs due to their net run rate being worse than Overseas Warriors which meant that they were knocked out in the group stage.

2022 season

In July 2022, Kamran Akmal was announced as Bagh Stallion’s icon player.

Team identity

Current squad

Captains

Coaches

Result summary

Overall result in KPL

Head-to-head record

Source: , Last updated: 31 January 2022

Statistics

Most runs 

Source: Cricinfo, Last updated: 22 August 2022

Most wickets 

Source: , Last Updated: 23 August 2022

References

External links

Azad Kashmir
Kashmir Premier League (Pakistan)
Cricket teams in Pakistan